Saïra Issambet, whose real name is born January 20 in brazzaville  is a Congolese professional footballer who plays as a defensive midfielder

''''''  (born 20 January 1998) is a Congolese football midfielder who plays for Étoile du Congo.

References

1998 births
Living people
Republic of the Congo footballers
Republic of the Congo international footballers
ACNFF players
Ferroviário Atlético Clube (CE) players
Étoile du Congo players
Fath Union Sport players
USM Blida players
Association football midfielders
Republic of the Congo expatriate footballers
Expatriate footballers in Mozambique
Republic of the Congo expatriate sportspeople in Mozambique
Expatriate footballers in Morocco
Republic of the Congo expatriate sportspeople in Morocco
Expatriate footballers in Algeria
Republic of the Congo expatriate sportspeople in Algeria
Expatriate footballers in Oman
Republic of the Congo expatriate sportspeople in Oman